White Heat: 30 Hits is a two-disc compilation album by Australian rock band Icehouse, released on 26 August 2011 in Australia. While it is technically their third best-of compilation, following 1989's Great Southern Land and 1992's Masterfile (not counting a singles box set released in the mid-1990s that was not widely distributed), it is the first such compilation spanning the band's entire career, including both their early- to mid-1980s hits and material from their most commercially successful period, beginning with the studio album Man of Colours (1987).

The album presents the band's complete singles catalogue, all in chronological order, with 15 tracks on each disc. There is also a 3-disc edition which includes a DVD featuring all 32 of the band's music videos, also in chronological order. The DVD contains a 5.1 mix in Dolby Digital AC-3.

The album's cover art was designed by Sydney design studio Debaser, and features the laser cage in which Iva Davies performed during the band's time as Flowers. This can be seen in the "Flowers Folio" section of the band's website. The tracks were remastered by Steve Smart at Studios 301 Mastering.

Track listing

DVD
 "Can't Help Myself"
 "We Can Get Together" (Australasian version)
 "We Can Get Together" (international version)
 "Walls"
 "Icehouse"
 "Love in Motion" (original version)
 "Great Southern Land"
 "Hey, Little Girl"
 "Street Cafe"
 "Glam"
 "Taking the Town"
 "Don't Believe Anymore"
 "Dusty Pages"
 "No Promises" (international version)
 "No Promises" (UK version)
 "Baby, You're So Strange"
 "Mr Big"
 "Cross the Border"
 "Crazy" (Australasian version)
 "Crazy" (international version)
 "Electric Blue"
 "My Obsession"
 "Man of Colours"
 "Nothing Too Serious"
 "Touch the Fire"
 "Big Fun"
 "Miss Divine"
 "Anything Is Possible"
 "Satellite"
 "Big Wheel"
 "Invisible People"
 "Love in Motion" (with Christina Amphlett)
 "Sister" (from Countdown 1980)

Charts

Year-end charts

Certifications

}

References

External links

2011 compilation albums
2011 video albums
Icehouse (band) albums
Universal Music Group compilation albums
Compilation albums by Australian artists
Albums produced by Keith Forsey
Albums produced by Nick Launay
Albums produced by Rhett Davies
Albums produced by Bill Laswell